Beirut Governorate is a Lebanese governorate that consists of one district and one city, Beirut, which is also its capital, and the capital of Lebanon.

The area of this governorate is 19.8 km2 (without suburbs); despite its small size, it is considered the most important region in Lebanon because of its economic, political, cultural, and social activity. The governor of the Beirut Governate is Greek Orthodox according to tradition, while the mayor of the City of Beirut is Sunni Muslim. Beirut is known to be the most religiously diverse city in the Middle East. There are about 2.5 million people in Beirut and its suburbs (Greater Beirut).

Cities
 Beirut (Greater Beirut)

Religion

Beirut Governorate is a diverse governorate containing many religions in a tiny geography. 
These numbers are a representation of the number of voters in Beirut who are eligible to vote only.

References

 
Governorates of Lebanon